Juan Domingo Brown (20 June 1888 – 16 September 1932) was an Argentine international footballer.

Early life
Brown was an Argentine of Scottish origin.

Brown had five cousins who were also Argentine international players – Alfredo, Carlos, Eliseo, Ernesto and Jorge. Two other cousins – Diego and Tomás – were also footballers.

Career
Brown played club football for Alumni and Quilmes.

Brown made 36 appearances for the Argentina national team between 1906 and 1916, scoring two goals.

References

Argentine footballers
Argentina international footballers
Argentine Primera División players
Alumni Athletic Club players
Quilmes Atlético Club footballers
Argentine people of Scottish descent
1888 births
1931 deaths
Association football defenders
Brown family (Argentina)